Aquithie is a hamlet in Aberdeenshire, Scotland, belonging to the parish of Kemnay. It is best known for its Aquithie Boarding & Quarantine Kennels.

Etymology
The hamlet was spelt Auchythe in 1481 and Auchinquhothie in 1646. Aquithie is pronounced " A-why-thie."

References

Villages in Aberdeenshire